Weibo Awards (Chinese: 微博电影之夜) or commonly known as Weibo Night, is a comprehensive honor ceremony hosted by Sina in mainland China. It was founded in 2004. The honor ceremony is a comprehensive honor ceremony for annual inventory and selection of hot people and hot events of the year. It was formerly known as Sina.com Top Ten News Selection of the Year, Sina Network China Annual Selection, and Sina Network Ceremony.

The important awards of Weibo Night are: Film of the Year, TV Series of the Year and Director of the Year. The honor results are determined by Sina Weibo's annual "Weibo Index" to determine the candidates for each honor, and then make the final evaluation based on the number of votes of the candidates' netizens and comprehensive expert opinions.

History 
Since 2000, every December, Sina and Southern Weekly will host the "Southern Weekend-Sina Annual Person Selection"; since 2002, every January, Sina and Xinhuanet will hold the "Annual Top 10 Domestic and International News Selection Activities”. These two annual selection activities are also the embryonic form of Weibo Night.

In January 2004, Sina teamed up with Southern Weekly and Xinhuanet to hold the "Sina.com 2003 Top Ten News Selection Awards Gala (1st Weibo Night)".

In December 2004, Southern Weekly began to independently hold the "Person of the Year Selection"; in the same month, Xinhuanet stopped holding the "Annual Top 10 Domestic and International News Selection Activities".

In January 2005, it officially changed its name to "Sina Network China Annual Selection Awards Gala", and Sina independently held "Sina 2004 Network China Annual Selection Awards Gala (2nd Weibo Night)".

In January 2006, it officially changed its name to "Sina Network Festival" and held "Sina 2005 Network Festival (3rd Weibo Night)".

In January 2007, Sina joined hands with a TV platform for the first time, and the Sina 2006 Network Ceremony (the 4th Weibo Night) was broadcast on Jiangxi Satellite TV.

In January 2012, it officially changed its name to "Weibo Night" and held "2011 Weibo Night (9th Weibo Night)". In the same year, Zhejiang Weibo Night [11] was added.

In January 2013, Hubei Weibo Night and Anhui Weibo Night [13] were added.

In January 2017, Shaanxi Weibo Night was added.

In December 2019, Hunan Weibo Night was added.

Selection Rules 
There are 5 lists in Weibo Night, namely Annual Event, Annual Person, Annual Buzzword, Weibo King, and Weibo Queen, which include the hot events and figures that attracted the most attention from netizens on Weibo last year. According to the microblog topic popularity value corresponding to the event (or person) on the list and the personal microblog reading volume, the ranking is selected, classified and sorted into the list, and the ranking is determined by netizens' voting.

The specific voting method of netizens is as follows:

Direct voting 
Users log in to Weibo via computer or Weibo mobile client, and click the voting buttons for annual event, annual person, annual buzzword, Weibo King, and Weibo Queen to participate in voting. Each user has 10 voting opportunities per day; participating in voting for 5 consecutive days, the daily voting opportunities will increase to 15 votes; participating in voting for 10 consecutive days, the daily voting opportunities will increase to 20 votes; the daily user's regular votes are used up, you can do tasks Continue canvassing.

Weibo King and Weibo Queen canvass votes 
Oasis app: Before 0:00 on January 1 of the year of the event, users log in to the Oasis app and click on the guardian of the corresponding artist on the event page to add 15 votes for the corresponding artist; each user can solicit votes for each artist once a day through the Oasis app. After 0:00 on January 1 of the holding year, the user logs in to the Oasis app, and clicks to protect the corresponding artist on the event page, and 50 votes can be added to the corresponding artist; each user can canvass for different artists once a day through the Oasis app.

Chaohua Community: Users can add 10 votes to the corresponding artist through 3 interactions with the corresponding artist. Each user can solicit votes for different artists once a day through the Chaohua community.

Sina News Client: Users can add 10 votes for the corresponding artist by commenting on the corresponding artist news 3 times on the Sina News client. Each user can solicit votes for different artists once a day through the Sina News client.

Fan group: Join any fan group of the corresponding artist, and speak once in any fan group, which can increase 10 votes for the corresponding artist. Each user can solicit votes for different artists once a day through the fan group.

One live broadcast: watch the live broadcast for 2 minutes on the Yi live view client, and you can add 10 votes to an artist every day. Each user can only solicit votes for 1 artist once a day.

Time-limited voting for Weibo King and Weibo Queen 
From 00:00 on January 11 to 20:00 on January 11 of the host year, you can get one voting opportunity every 5 minutes; the number of votes within 5 minutes is valid and will not be accumulated.

Soliciting votes on the character list 
From 00:00 on December 20 to 0:00 on January 1 of the year when the user logs in to the Oasis app, click on the support for the corresponding character on the event page to add 15 votes to the character; Canvass 1 time. After 0:00 on January 1 of the holding year, the user logs in to the Oasis app, clicks to support the corresponding character on the event page, and 50 votes can be added to the corresponding character; each user can solicit votes for different characters once a day through the Oasis app.

Note: The above are the selection rules for Weibo Night 2019.

Ceremony

Movie of the Year & TV Series of the Year 

Note: – means there was no winner that year

The Most Awarded

References 

Chinese television awards
Awards established in 2004
2004 establishments in China
Sina Corp
Recurring events established in 2004